Reine Andersson (4 June 1945 – 2 January 2005) was a Swedish sailor. He competed in the Flying Dutchman event at the 1976 Summer Olympics.

References

External links
 

1945 births
2005 deaths
Swedish male sailors (sport)
Olympic sailors of Sweden
Sailors at the 1976 Summer Olympics – Flying Dutchman
Sportspeople from Gothenburg